C.A.R. is a studio album by American rapper Serengeti. It was released on Anticon in 2012. Music videos were created for "Amnesia" and "Peekaboo".

Critical reception

At Metacritic, which assigns a weighted average score out of 100 to reviews from mainstream critics, the album received an average score of 78, based on 8 reviews, indicating "generally favorable reviews".

Bram Gieben of The Skinny gave the album 4 out of 5 stars, describing it as "a deliciously loose and accessible album from the awkward artistic leaders of the US underground hip-hop scene." He added: "Neither a challenging nor particularly groundbreaking record, it's still enormously satisfying." Jonah Bromwich of Pitchfork gave the album a 7.6 out of 10, saying, "C.A.R. is an excellent, devastating record, a chronicle of the amiable pessimism and occasional nihilism of a rapping Bukowski who can't seem to find a way out of the condition in which he finds himself."

Thomas Quinlan of Exclaim! placed it at number 6 on the "Top 10 Albums of 2012" list.

Track listing

Personnel
Credits adapted from liner notes.

 Serengeti – vocals
 Odd Nosdam – production, mixing
 Jel – vocals (3), turntables, production
 Yoni Wolf – vocals (5), guitar (5), bass guitar (5), blocks (5), co-production (5)
 Dee Kesler – vocals (7), guitar (7)
 Armando Perez – vocals (7)
 Daddy Kev – mastering
 Jesselisa Moretti – design
 Chloe Aftel – photography

References

External links
 

2012 albums
Serengeti (rapper) albums
Anticon albums
Albums produced by Jel (music producer)
Albums produced by Odd Nosdam